Alastor facilis is a species of wasp in the family Vespidae.

References

facilis